Ahmed Mohammed Khan (24 December 1926 – 27 August 2017) was an Indian footballer. He participated in the 1948 and 1952 Summer Olympics. He was also vice-captain of India from 1949 to 1954.

Club career
Khan played in the 1948 and 1952 Summer Olympics and figured for East Bengal from 1949 to 1959, and captained the team in 1954–55. He spent most of his club career in East Bengal. Khan was part of the team that played against German side Kickers Offenbach and FC Torpedo Moscow in 1953. In the same year, he went on to play for the team at the World Youth Festival in  Bucharest, Romania. He netted one in their 6–1 victory against Lebanon XI.

He was also one of the "Pancha Pandavas" of the club who, besides him, comprised forwards Dhanraj, Appa Rao, Saleh and Venkatesh. They all helped East Bengal bag the prestigious IFA Shield, Calcutta Football League and Rovers Cup in 1949 and become the first Indian club to win the Durand Cup in 1951. He also played for Bangalore Muslims FC.

International career
He made his Olympic debut in 1948 London Olympics, where Balaidas Chatterjee managed India lost 1–2 to heavyweight France. He also won gold at the 1951 Asian Games, held in New Delhi. At the 1952 Summer Olympics in Helsinki, Khan played under Sailen Manna's captaincy, but India was thrashed by Yugoslavia 10–1. He scored India's lone goal in that match.

Khan later participated in 1953 Quadrangular tournament in Rangoon with Balaidas Chatterjee managed team, and won the title.

Honours
Bangalore Muslims
Rovers Cup: 1948

East Bengal
IFA Shield: 1949, 1950, 1951, 1958
Durand Cup: 1951, 1952, 1956
Calcutta Football League: 1949, 1950, 1952
Rovers Cup: 1949
DCM Trophy: 1950, 1952, 1957
Dr. H. K. Mookherjee Shield: 1957
P. K. Nair Gold Cup: 1956

India
Asian Games Gold medal: 1951
 Colombo Cup: 1953, 1954

Individual
 East Bengal Best Forward of the Millennium
 East Bengal "Bharat Gaurav Award": 2012

See also

List of East Bengal Club captains
Pancha Pandavas
India national football team at the Olympics

References

Bibliography

 

Chattopadhyay, Hariprasad (2017). Mohun Bagan–East Bengal . Kolkata: Parul Prakashan.

External links
 

1926 births
2017 deaths
Indian footballers
India international footballers
Asian Games medalists in football
Footballers at the 1948 Summer Olympics
Footballers at the 1952 Summer Olympics
Footballers at the 1951 Asian Games
Footballers at the 1954 Asian Games
Footballers from Bangalore
East Bengal Club players
Medalists at the 1951 Asian Games
Olympic footballers of India
Asian Games gold medalists for India
Association footballers not categorized by position
Bangalore Muslims FC players
Calcutta Football League players